is a train station on the Shinonoi Line in the city of Nagano, Nagano Prefecture, Japan, operated by East Japan Railway Company (JR East).

Lines
Inariyama Station is served by the Shinonoi Line and is 62.3 kilometers from the starting point of the line at Shiojiri Station.

Station layout
The station consists of two ground-level side platforms, connected to the station building by a footbridge. The station is a  Kan'i itaku station.

Platforms

History
Inariyama Station opened on 1 November 1900. With the privatization of Japanese National Railways (JNR) on 1 April 1987, the station came under the control of JR East.

Passenger statistics
In fiscal 2015, the station was used by an average of 358 passengers daily (boarding passengers only).

Surrounding area
Hase-dera
Inariyama-juku

See also
 List of railway stations in Japan

References

External links

 JR East station information 

Railway stations in Japan opened in 1900
Stations of East Japan Railway Company
Shinonoi Line
Railway stations in Nagano (city)